National Institute of Advanced Studies (NIAS) is a premier institute in India engaged in interdisciplinary and multidisciplinary research in natural sciences, social sciences, arts and humanities. It was founded by J. R. D. Tata for providing an avenue for administrators, managers and social leaders for interaction and exchange of information with notable academics in the areas of science, arts and humanities. With these objectives, the institute conducts multi-level research programmes and mentors talented doctoral students. The institution, based in Bengaluru, in the south Indian state of Karnataka, started functioning on 20 June 1988 with Dr. Raja Ramanna as its founder director.

Overview
The National Institute of Advanced Studies was conceived by Jehangir Ratanji Dadabhoy Tata, a businessman and a pioneer of Indian aviation, who envisaged the institute to act as a meeting ground for the intellectuals of India for exchange views and ideas. The institute came into being on 20 June 1988, registered as a society under the Karnataka Societies Registration Regulation Act with Raja Ramanna, the Indian physicist, as the founder director. During a short period when he joined the central government as a Minister of State, C. N. R. Rao held the responsibilities of the director as the honorary director (pro tempore). Ramanna returned to NIAS and stayed with the institute until his superannuation in July 1997 to hand over the directorship to Roddam Narasimha who headed NIAS until March 2004. The next director, K. Kasturirangan, was with NIAS from April 2004 until August 2009 and the leadership changed hands to V. S. Ramamurthy, in September 2009. Baldev Raj became the director of the institute in 2014, and served the office until his untimely demise on January 6, 2018. V. S. Ramamurthy, the former director of the institute was called in as the interim director. Shailesh Nayak took the charge of the institute's directorship in March 2018.

National Institute of Advanced Studies is involved in four areas of activities such as research, analysis, publications and education. It acts as a platform for advanced research in the disciplines of sciences, arts, and humanities. The research findings are compiled and disseminated through printed literature, personal interactions, lectures and conferences. The centre works as a forum for the social and political leaders and academics to interact with each other for interdisciplinary exchange of knowledge and information. Besides regular courses, it also started PhD programmes in 2004.

NIAS is located within the campus of the Indian Institute of Science, Bengaluru, with an extent of five acres earmarked for the institute's activities. The campus houses lecture halls, conference facilities, theatre and an auditorium, J. R. D. Tata Auditorium, named after its founder. The institute maintains a well stocked library and has accommodation facilities for guests and visitors.

Objectives
The institute is mandated with a mission to:
 Organize interdisciplinary and multidisciplinary research in natural sciences, social sciences, arts, humanities and technology.
 Integrate the research findings and dissemination of information for the benefit of Indian and global society.
 Create a new leadership in all sectors of the society by education and interaction.

Divisions
The academic activities of the institute is segmented to fall under four schools. Each school functions as a separate division and has a host of permanent teaching faculty and a set of visiting professors.

School of Conflict and Security Studies This new School has come into being in May 2016 and covers research in areas related to conflict resolution, strategy and security issues.  Programmes of the School focus on major conflicts that affect India or have the potential to do so; and international strategic and geopolitical issues that have bearing on India's national security.

School of Humanities is a centre for advanced research in the disciplines of philosophy, psychology, literature, fine arts and culture. The school offers research facilities in:
 Cognitive sciences
 Scientific and philosophical studies of consciousness
 Indian psychology and philosophy
 History and philosophy of biology
 Archaeometalurgy and analysis of ancient metals
 Neuropsychiatry, Neurophenemenology and Neurophilosophy

School of Social Sciences is a research platform but is also engaged in teaching, outreach, advocacy and consultancy. It undertakes research cum outreach projects in the areas of education, gender, inequality, governance, urbanization and development. It has interests in the topics of globalization, economic sociology and organizations.

School of Natural Sciences and Engineering is the division which focuses on energy, environment, climate change, complex systems, ecology, animal behaviour, cognition and conservation biology. Studies are conducted on wildlife conservation and cognitive studies of primates. Research has been carried out number theory, artificial intelligence, soft computing, and mathematical modelling of complex chaotic systems.

Courses
The institute offers several courses through four of its schools and many programmes anchored by the institute. Listed below are few of the many interdisciplinary courses offered at the institute.

 School of Conflict and Security Studies
 Understanding Theories of Conflict
 Global Politics
 Maritime Security
 GIS application in security

 School of Humanities
 Course title: Relevance of Psychology
 Behavior, Cognition and Consciousness: An Introduction
 Core course in Humanities
 Effective Communication and Interpersonal Intelligence

 School of Natural and Engineering Sciences
 Energy Systems: Technology and Policy
 Introduction to Dynamical Systems Theory

 School of Social Sciences
 Anthropology of circulation and value
 Gifted Education
 Perspectives in Education Research
 Core course in Social Sciences

Notable faculty
Several notable personalities have served as the members of faculty at NIAS, some of whom have been awarded the highest civilian awards in the country. The institute hosts four chairs of excellence namely JRD Tata Chair, Raja Ramanna Chair, Homi Bhabha Chair and T. V. Raman Pai chair.
 Raja Ramanna, Physicist and Padma Vibhushan awardee
M. N. Srinivas, Sociologist and Padma Bhushan awardee
 C. N. R. Rao, Chemist and Bharat Ratna awardee
 Roddam Narasimha, Aerospace scientist and Padma Vibhushan awardee
 K. Kasturirangan, Space scientist and Padma Vibhushan awardee
 V. S. Ramamurthy, Nuclear physicist and Padma Bhushan awardee
 B. V. Sreekantan, Physicist and Padma Bhushan awardee
 C. Venkataraman Sundaram, Metallurgist and Padma Bhushan awardee
 Timothy Poston, Mathematician
 Shadakshari Settar, Art-Historian
 Sundar Sarukkai, Philosopher
 Sharada Srinivasan, Archaeologist
 Ricky Kej, Grammy Award winner

See also

 Indian Institute of Science

References

1988 establishments in Karnataka
Research institutes in Bangalore
Multidisciplinary research institutes
Educational institutions established in 1988
Organisations based in Bangalore